Kristen McGuire is an American voice actress and script writer affiliated with Funimation and Bang Zoom! Entertainment. She started as a comic book artist, before later joining Funimation as a voice actress. Some of her noteworthy roles include Milim Nava a in That Time I Got Reincarnated as a Slime, Ruri in Dr. Stone, Chiyo Kurihara in Prison School, Senko in the English dub of The Helpful Fox Senko-san, and Alice in The Duke of Death and His Maid.

Biography

McGuire started working professionally as a comic artist. She was later invited to a comic book convention as a guest of honor, where she met a voice actor with Funimation. After hearing Funimation offered open auditions, she decided to apply. Five months later in June 2013, she was asked to come in for an audition, where she was cast as minor characters in a Funimation dub.

In 2021, McGuire became engaged with fellow voice actor Clifford Chapin.

Filmography

Anime series

Animation

Films

Video games

Production credits

ADR directing

ADR script

References

External links

Living people
American female comics artists
American video game actresses
American voice actresses
American voice directors
American women television writers
Funimation
Year of birth missing (living people)